Thunderchild 115B is an Indian reserve of the Thunderchild First Nation in Saskatchewan. It is 85 kilometres northwest of North Battleford. In the 2016 Canadian Census, it recorded a population of 706 living in 172 of its 200 total private dwellings. In the same year, its Community Well-Being index was calculated at 42 of 100, compared to 58.4 for the average First Nations community and 77.5 for the average non-Indigenous community.

References

Indian reserves in Saskatchewan
Division No. 17, Saskatchewan